Vicente de Paula Neto  (born 10 September 1979) more commonly known simply as Vicente, is a retired Brazilian football striker who spent most of his career in China.

Club career

Early career
Vicente would play his early career in Brazil where he would predominantly play for lower league side AA Flamengo in the Campeonato Paulista Série A3 division. He was also then loaned out to another regional lower league side Caxias FC where he played for one season in the Campeonato Catarinense Second Level.

Move to China
Vicente would move to China to join the second tier football club Wuhan Guanggu in the 2004 league season where he had a successful period with them when he won the Chinese Football Association Jia League title and helped them win promotion. The following season would see Vicente continue his successful time with Wuhan when he won the Chinese Super League cup in 2005 to add further silverware with the team. His performances with Wuhan would attract the interests of Inter Shanghai who he would join for the 2006 league season, however after only one season he would return to Wuhan. This time at the club he would not become as an integral member within the team and returned to Inter Shanghai who had changed its name to Shaanxi Chan-Ba. In March 2010, Vicente who had previously been linked to Jiangsu Sainty and Shenyang Dongjin moved to Shanghai Shenhua as a free agent.

Honours
Wuhan Guanggu
 Chinese Football Association Jia League: 2004
 Chinese Super League Cup: 2005

References

External links
 
 
 Profile at sodasoccer.com

1979 births
Living people
Brazilian footballers
Brazilian expatriate footballers
Expatriate footballers in China
Brazilian expatriate sportspeople in China
Wuhan Guanggu players
Beijing Renhe F.C. players
Shanghai Shenhua F.C. players
Wuhan F.C. players
Xinjiang Tianshan Leopard F.C. players
Chinese Super League players
China League One players
Association football forwards
Sportspeople from Salvador, Bahia